Conseil scolaire catholique MonAvenir is a Roman Catholic French first language public-separate school board that manages elementary and secondary schools in the Greater Golden Horseshoe. The school board operates 46 elementary schools, 11 secondary schools, and two combined institutions within that area. Conseil scolaire catholique MonAvenir is headquartered in the Centre d'éducation catholique Omer-Deslauriers (Omer Deslauriers Centre of Catholic Education) in Toronto, Ontario, Canada.

The school board was formed in 1998 after several local school boards were amalgamated into the French-language Separate District School Board No. 64. From 1999 to 2017, the school board was known as the Conseil scolaire de district catholique Centre-Sud. The school board adopted its current name in 2017.

The school board does not operate public-secular French first language in the Greater Golden Horseshoe. Public-secular French language schools in the Greater Golden Horseshoe are operated by Conseil scolaire Viamonde.

Jurisdiction
The CSDCCS provides French-language school services to the following areas in Ontario:

the cities of Toronto, Hamilton and Kawartha Lakes
the regional municipalities of Durham, York, Peel, Halton, Niagara and Waterloo,
the Counties of Brant, Dufferin, Haldimand, Norfolk, Northumberland, Peterborough, Simcoe and Wellington,
the District Municipality of Muskoka, and
in the District of Parry Sound, the Town of Parry Sound and the Townships of Carling, McDougall, McKellar and Seguin.

History

The school board was formed as the French-language Separate District School Board No. 64 in 1998, as a part of the province-wide restructuring of Ontario's school boards resulting from the Fewer School Boards Act, 1997, The new school board assumed control over public French-language separate school previously managed by other school boards in the Greater Golden Horseshoe. French separate school boards and departments that were amalgamated into the new school board includes the Conseil des écoles catholiques du Grand Toronto, the French language unit the Metropolitan Separate School Board (reorganized into the Toronto Catholic District School Board after the enactment of the Fewer School Boards Act).

In 1999, the school board was renamed Conseil scolaire de district catholique Centre-Sud. In May 2017, it was renamed to the Conseil scolaire catholique MonAvenir.

Schools
The Board's schools cover the Greater Golden Horseshoe area of Ontario. The school board operates 46 elementary schools, 11 secondary schools, and two schools that provides both elementary, and secondary levels of education.

See also
List of school districts in Ontario
List of high schools in Ontario

Notes

References

External links
 School Board information
 Conseil scolaire catholique MonAvenir
 Conseil scolaire catholique MonAvenir 
 
  

French-language school districts in Ontario
Roman Catholic school districts in Ontario
Education in Toronto
North York
Lists of schools in Toronto
Roman Catholic Archdiocese of Toronto